Hortensia Galeana Sánchez is a Mexican mathematician specializing in graph theory, including graph coloring and the independent dominating sets ("kernels") of directed graphs. She is director of the Institute of Mathematics at the National Autonomous University of Mexico (UNAM).

Education and career
Galeana is originally from Mexico City. She was educated at UNAM, earning bachelor's master's, and doctoral degrees there, in 1978, 1981, and 1985 respectively. Her 1985 doctoral dissertation, Algunos resultados en la teoría de núcleos en digráficas, was supervised by Víctor Neumann-Lara.

She has taught at UNAM since 1977, and was named director of the UNAM Institute of Mathematics in 2022.

Recognition
Galeana is a member of the Mexican Academy of Sciences. In 1995 and again in 2015 UNAM gave her their National University Prize.

References

External links

Year of birth missing (living people)
Living people
Mexican mathematicians
Mexican women mathematicians
Graph theorists
National Autonomous University of Mexico alumni
Academic staff of the National Autonomous University of Mexico
Members of the Mexican Academy of Sciences